Lamar Rogers (born November 5, 1967, in Opp, Alabama) is a former American football defensive end in the National Football League. He played for the Cincinnati Bengals in 1991 and 1992.  Rogers played college football at Auburn University.

External links
Just Sports Stats

1967 births
Living people
People from Opp, Alabama
American football defensive ends
Cincinnati Bengals players
Scottish Claymores players
Tampa Bay Storm players
Florida Bobcats players
Auburn Tigers football players